Dombey and Son is a British television miniseries in ten parts produced by the BBC and first broadcast in 1983. It was based on the 1848 novel Dombey and Son by Charles Dickens.

It was adapted by James Andrew Hall and directed by Rodney Bennett.

Cast 
Julian Glover - Paul Dombey Sr.
Shirley Cain - Miss Tox
Zelah Clarke - Susan Nipper
Kenton Moore - Towlinson
Lysette Anthony - Florence Dombey
Rhoda Lewis - Louisa Chick
Paul Darrow - Mr. Carker
Roger Milner - Solomon Gills
Emrys James - Captain Cuttle
Ronald Herdman - Perch
Sharon Maughan - Edith Granger (later Dombey)
Ivor Roberts - Mr. Chick
James Cossins - Major Bagstock
Jenny McCracken - Polly Toodle (Mrs. Richards)
Steve Fletcher - Biler (Rob Toodle)
Neal Swettenham - Mr. Toots
Max Gold - Walter Gay
Barbara Hicks - Mrs. Pipchin
Paul Imbusch - Dr. Parker Peps
Barnaby Buik - Paul Dombey, Jr.
Romyanna Wood - Florence Dombey (younger)
Diana King - Hon. Mrs. Skewton
Andrew Dunford - Withers
Anthony Dutton - Mr. Toodle

References

External links

 

1983 British television series debuts
1983 British television series endings
1980s British drama television series
BBC television dramas
1980s British television miniseries
Period television series
Television shows based on works by Charles Dickens
English-language television shows
Films based on works by Charles Dickens